Hollings is a surname. Notable people with the surname include:

Chloé Hollings, French-Australian actress
Ernest Hollings (1922–2019), American politician
John Hollings (1683?–1739), English physician
Tony Hollings (born 1981), American football player

See also
Holling (disambiguation)
Hollings Center, international relations organization